Skolar may refer to the following: 
 London Skolars, a professional rugby league club
 Skolar (typeface), a multi-script font family